Reijo Halme (13 March 1899 – 8 April 1941) was a Finnish sprinter. He competed in the men's 100 metres and the 4x100 metres events at the 1924 Summer Olympics.

References

External links
 

1899 births
1941 deaths
Athletes (track and field) at the 1924 Summer Olympics
Finnish male sprinters
Olympic athletes of Finland
Sportspeople from Tampere